is a Prefectural Natural Park in Akita Prefecture, Japan. Established in 2004, the park spans the borders of the municipalities of Fujisato and Happō, and takes its name from the Shirakami-Sanchi.

Shirakami Sanchi is a mountainous region that contains one of Japan's untouched beech forests. Natural Park has two separate zones. One is internal, untouched in the heart of the region and it is part of the protected nature under the auspices of UNESCO and a larger external buffer zone, in which tourist visits are allowed.

See also
 National Parks of Japan
 Parks and gardens in Akita Prefecture

References

Parks and gardens in Akita Prefecture
Protected areas established in 2004
2004 establishments in Japan
Fujisato, Akita
Happō, Akita